Seonggaksa was a temple located in Dochodo, South Jeolla, South Korea.

References 

Sinan County, South Jeolla
Buddhist temples in South Korea